Batzke's House is the former gardener's house at Frederiksborg Castle in Hillerød, Denmark. It was built on a hilltop near the castle in 1720 to a design by Johan Cornelius Krieger. It was listed in 1924.

References

Houses in Hillerød Municipality
Listed buildings and structures in Hillerød Municipality
Hillerød